Vash may refer to:

 Vash, a fictional character from the Star Trek media franchise
 Vash the Stampede, the protagonist of Trigun, a manga series created by Yasuhiro Nightow in 1995
 Vash Young, American author of motivational and self-improvement books
 Veterans Affairs Supportive Housing (VASH) - see HUD-VASH

See also 

 Vaush, an American libertarian left streamer